Hibiscus heterophyllus, commonly known as native rosella or toilet paper bush,  is a flowering plant in the family Malvaceae. It a shrub or small tree with white, pale pink or yellow flowers with a dark red centre and grows in New South Wales and Queensland.

Description
Hibiscus heterophyllus is a shrub or small tree with more or less smooth, prickly stems. Flowering occurs from spring to summer.

Taxonomy and naming
Hibiscus heterophyllus was first formally described in 1805 by Étienne Pierre Ventenat and the description was published in Jardin de la Malmaison. The specific epithet (heterophyllus) means "different" and "leaved" with reference to having varying shaped leaves.

Distribution and habitat
This species is usually found in open forest, rainforest or nearby, from north-east Queensland to the south coast of New South Wales.

References

Flora of New South Wales
Flora of Queensland
heterophyllus
Malvales of Australia
Drought-tolerant trees
Trees of Australia